The 1899 Cork Senior Hurling Championship was the 13th staging of the Cork Senior Hurling Championship since its establishment by the Cork County Board in 1887.

Blackrock were the defending champions, however, they were defeated by Ballyhea.

On 6 August 1899, St Finbarr’s won the championship following an 0-8 to 0-7 defeat of Redmonds in the final. This was their first championship title.

Results

Final

Miscellaneous

 St. Finbarr’s win their first title.

References

Cork Senior Hurling Championship
Cork Senior Hurling Championship